In geometry, the infinite-order triangular tiling is a regular tiling of the hyperbolic plane with a Schläfli symbol of {3,∞}. All vertices are ideal, located at "infinity" and seen on the boundary of the Poincaré hyperbolic disk projection.

Symmetry 
A lower symmetry form has alternating colors, and represented by cyclic symbol {(3,∞,3)}, . The tiling also represents the fundamental domains of the *∞∞∞ symmetry, which can be seen with 3 colors of lines representing 3 mirrors of the construction.

Related polyhedra and tiling
This tiling is topologically related as part of a sequence of regular polyhedra with Schläfli symbol {3,p}.

Other infinite-order triangular tilings
A nonregular infinite-order triangular tiling can be generated by a recursive process from a central triangle as shown here:

See also

Infinite-order tetrahedral honeycomb
List of regular polytopes
List of uniform planar tilings
Tilings of regular polygons
Triangular tiling
Uniform tilings in hyperbolic plane

References
 John H. Conway, Heidi Burgiel, Chaim Goodman-Strass, The Symmetries of Things 2008,  (Chapter 19, The Hyperbolic Archimedean Tessellations)

External links

Hyperbolic tilings
Infinite-order tilings
Isogonal tilings
Isohedral tilings
Regular tilings
Triangular tilings